is Japanese book of Chinese prose and poetry. It was compiled around the middle of the 11th century during the Heian period by Fujiwara no Akihira.

Composition

Honchō Monzui is 14 volumes in length and contains 432 entries from 69 people over a period of approximately 240 years. The purpose of the work was to create a model and reference for writers. Entries are divided into 39 sections. Divisions are based on Chinese Wén Xuǎn (文選) in which the two share 12 sections.

Title

The word honchō means Japan and is used in opposition to China. When prefixed before a title, it expresses that something is a Japanese version based on a Chinese original. Honchō Monzui is modeled after Yáo Xuàn's (姚鉉) Táng Wén Cuì (唐文粋). (The Japanese reading of this title is Tō Monzui.)

However, the commonly accepted reading is "monzui".

Influence

Honchō Monzui had wide range of influence on later literature.

References 
 
 
 

Late Old Japanese texts
11th-century Japanese books